Goryamino is a rural locality (a village) in Cherkutinskoye Rural Settlement, Sobinsky District, Vladimir Oblast, Russia. The population was 1 as of 2010.

Geography 
Goryamino is located on the Vorsha River, 33 km northwest of Sobinka (the district's administrative centre) by road. Demikhovo is the nearest rural locality.

References 

Rural localities in Sobinsky District